Lazarus Bird is the fifth and final full-length album by Swedish progressive metal band Burst, released on September 16, 2008 by Relapse Records. It features lengthier songs than the albums before it, averaging 7.5 minutes per song. It also exhibits a more experimental nature than any of Burst's previous records.

Recording was completed in Studio Bohussound in Kungalv, Sweden, in May 2008. The album's core concept was described by the band as "homogenic" and "thematic".

Track listing

Personnel
Burst
 Patrik Hultin – drums
 Linus Jägerskog – vocals
 Jesper Liveröd – bass
 Robert Reinholdz – guitar and vocals
 Jonas Rydberg – guitar
Additional personnel
 Ulf Eriksson – saxophone 
 Jonas Rydberg – engineering
 Robert Reinholdz – engineering
 Dragan Tasmankovic – mastering
 Fredrik Reinedahl – production, engineering
 Oskar Karlsson – additional vocal production
 Emma Svensson – photography
 Orion Landau – design, artwork

References

2008 albums
Burst (band) albums
Relapse Records albums